The Qingdao–Yancheng railway is a higher-speed railway on the eastern coast of China.

History
The railway opened on 26 December 2018.

From 30 December 2018, Yancheng North railway station was closed for passenger service and the southern terminus of the line changed to Yancheng railway station.

Stations

References

Railway lines in China
Railway lines opened in 2018